The First Schmidt cabinet was the government of Germany between 16 May 1974 and 14 December 1976, during the 7th legislature of the Bundestag. Led by the Social Democrat Helmut Schmidt, the cabinet was a coalition between the Social Democrats (SDP) and the Free Democratic Party (FDP). The Vice-Chancellor was the Free Democrat Hans-Dietrich Genscher (FDP).

Composition 

|}

References

Schmidt I
Schmidt I
1974 establishments in West Germany
1976 disestablishments in West Germany
Cabinets established in 1974
Cabinets disestablished in 1976
Helmut Schmidt